I Got That Work is the third studio album by American hip hop duo Big Tymers. Originally scheduled for a February 8, 2000 release, it was ultimately released May 16, 2000, by Universal Records and Baby's Cash Money Records. The album features the singles, "Get Your Roll On" and "#1 Stunna"; "#1 Stunna" was also featured on The Original Kings of Comedy soundtrack.

Commercial performance
I Got That Work debuted at #3 on the Billboard 200 with first-week sales of 187,000 copies in the US. The album received a  Platinum certification on September 15, 2000, by the Recording Industry Association of America.

Track listing
All tracks are produced by Mannie Fresh

Charts

Weekly charts

Year-end charts

Certifications

See also
List of Billboard number-one R&B albums of 2000

References

2000 albums
Cash Money Records albums
Big Tymers albums
Birdman (rapper) albums
Mannie Fresh albums